The Garden of Eden is a 2008 British-Spanish thriller drama film directed by John Irvin and starring Mena Suvari, Jack Huston and Caterina Murino.  It is based on the 1986 posthumously published novel of the same name by Ernest Hemingway.

Plot

Set in the late 1920s, David Bourne is an American writer and World War I veteran who meets and marries the alluring Catherine Hill after a whirlwind romance in Paris, France. They travel on a long honeymoon through the south of France and into Spain where David plans to write his next book; a non-fiction piece about his travels in Africa as a child with his explorer father who was also into big game hunting. Catherine soon becomes restless with David over his focused attention to writing and begins to play a series of mind games with him. Catherine grows more mentally unbalanced as she pushes David's patience and devotion to her in which she convinces David to dye his hair bleach-blonde, the color of hers, "so they are twins, summer-tanned and androgynous." They have sex then argue. David becomes both uncomfortable and curious when Catherine meets and brings a sultry Italian woman, named Marita, into their marriage to spice things up with both of them having sexual relations with Marita (but never at the same time). The erotic mind games David and Catherine play off against each other reach new levels when they use Marita to make each other jealous leading to Catherine indulging in more self-destructive behavior.

Cast
Mena Suvari as Catherine Hill Bourne
Jack Huston as David Bourne
Caterina Murino as Marita
Richard E. Grant as Colonel Philip Boyle
Matthew Modine as David's Father
Carmen Maura as Madame Aurol

Reception
The website's critics consensus reads: "Garden of Eden dramatizes Ernest Hemingway's clipped storytelling without carrying over the intelligence that undergirded the author's writing, yielding a thin drama full of artifice and no feeling." Metacritic, which sampled nine critics and calculated a weighted average score of 28 out of 100, reported that the film received "generally unfavorable reviews". Jesse Cataldo of Slant Magazine gave the film one and a half stars. Noel Murray of The A.V. Club graded the film a D+.

References

External links
 
 

2008 thriller drama films
British thriller drama films
Spanish thriller drama films
Films directed by John Irvin
Films based on works by Ernest Hemingway
Roadside Attractions films
2000s English-language films
2000s British films